The Siam Times was the first English-language newspaper ever published in Thailand on 28 July 1864 . It was founded by John Hassett Chandler who was the second consul of the United States of America ever posted to Thailand and a tutor to Prince Chulalongkorn hired by King Mongkut after the English governess Anna Leonowens left her position teaching English to the palace children. The newspaper was discontinued in December 1865.

See also 
Timeline of English-language newspapers published in Thailand
List of online newspaper archives - Thailand

References 

Defunct newspapers published in Thailand
English-language newspapers published in Asia
English-language newspapers published in Thailand
Mass media in Bangkok